Uruguayan literature has a long and eventful history.

Beginnings
Literature properly speaking starts in Uruguay with the country-flavoured poetry of Bartolomé Hidalgo, 1788-1822. The two leading figures of the Romantic period are Adolfo Berro and Juan Zorrilla de San Martín.ll

Modernistas
Julio Herrera y Reissig was one of the great fin-de-siècle modernistas, indeed one of the very greatest and subtlest of Latin American poets. Two leading women are Juana de Ibarbourou and Delmira Agustini; indeed, Ibarbourou defined a whole period of Spanish-American sentiment towards the poetic and was immensely popular. Emilio Frugoni and Emilio Oribe were distinguished lyricists.

Other important figures
Outstanding among the prose and fiction figures are Juan Carlos Onetti, Carlos Martínez Moreno, Eduardo Galeano, Felisberto Hernández, Mario Benedetti, Tomás de Mattos, Mauricio Rosencof and Jorge Majfud. 

Horacio Quiroga was an immensely popular as well as highly individual and flavourful short-story writer who has had vast influence. Constancio C. Vigil was once a beloved, if highly moralistic, children's writer.

Jorge Luis Borges, while Argentine, was an avid commentator on the Uruguayan historical and cultural scene; some of his characters are realistically Uruguayan.
Florencio Sánchez remains Uruguay's most famous theater writer.

Writers from Northern Uruguay
While many of Uruguay's writers have been primarily connected with the capital Montevideo, a number have been identified with the north of the country.

See also

 (sic), the magazine of the Uruguayan Association of Literature Teachers
 List of Uruguayan writers
 List of contemporary writers from northern Uruguay

External links
 Centro Cervantes

 
South American literature
Latin American literature by country
Spanish-language literature